The Skanner or The Skanner News is an African-American newspaper covering the Pacific Northwest of the United States. Its head office is in Portland, Oregon, with an additional office in Seattle, Washington. Prior to discontinuing regular print publication in 2020, it published three formats: a daily website at theskanner.com, a weekly printed newspaper, plus a facsimile of the printed edition online.

Bernard Foster started the paper in 1975. He became part-owner of the Northwest Dispatch in Tacoma, Washington in 1985, and launched a Seattle edition of the Skanner in 1996.

Foster served as secretary of the West Coast Black Publishers Association as early as 1983. In 1992, Foster, then president of the organization, announced a deal with Nordstrom to spend $220,000 on advertising in 20 Black papers in the west.

About
In this era of concentration of media ownership The Skanner News is proving to be one of few remaining privately-owned newspapers.

The Skanner'''s own reporters investigate the issues of all minorities in the Pacific Northwest, but the publication's subject matter also covers national and world news.The Skanner faces-off against government or large institutions that are treating minorities unfairly. It debates on the racial issues around gentrification, education and police accountability.

Each week The Skanner publishes one or more opinion articles by: Benjamin Chavis, Marian Wright Edelman, Earl Ofari Hutchinson, Jesse Jackson, Julianne Malveaux, Marc Morial or Al Sharpton.

The publication also features book reviews, film reviews and celebrity interviews from an African American perspective by Kam Williams.

The major state newspaper, The Oregonian, often publishes items from The Skanner on its website Oregon Live.

MissionThe Skanner views its products as a tool for the community to learn about what is happening around it, as well as giving readers an opportunity to voice their opinion. The Skanner is dedicated to advancing the Black Press in the Northwestern United States. The Skanner mission statement is "Challenging People to Shape a Better Future Now".

HistoryThe Skanner has published news in Portland since October 1975 and Seattle since 1990.

It was founded in 1975 by owners Bernie Foster and Bobbie Doré Foster, being inspired by the teachings of Martin Luther King Jr. It still publishes a special issue each January and holds a Martin Luther King celebratory breakfast where it gives college scholarships for academic achievement.

In 1979, the building was badly burned and much of its stock and equipment was destroyed. However the owners continued the paper's publication. Some suspected arson but it was not proved.

In 1989, The Skanner began campaigning for the renaming of Portland's Union Avenue to Martin Luther King Boulevard. The campaign was successful.

In 2009, the newspaper's owners installed security cameras on their head office in North Portland, to monitor an adjacent hot spot of drug deals and shootings, and made sure loiterers knew they were being watched. When crime went down by 50 percent, cops credited the decline in part to the paper's vigilance.

Since 2012, The Skanner'' has displayed a solar meter to chart the energy it is harnessing from the extensive banks of solar cells the owners had installed on the roof and awning of their North Killingsworth building.

References

External links
 Baltimore News article, business section Retrieved 2014-06-30
 TheSkanner.com daily news, Retrieved 2014-04-19

1975 establishments in Oregon
African-American history in Portland, Oregon
African-American history in Seattle
African-American newspapers
Newspapers published in Portland, Oregon
Newspapers published in Washington (state)
Newspapers established in 1975
Weekly newspapers published in the United States
African-American history of Oregon